The 2016 Isle of Man TT was held between 28 May and 10 June 2016, on the Isle of Man TT Mountain Course.

Practice Week 2016

TT Race Week 2016

Results

Practice Times

Race Results
Bennetts Lightweight TT - Result Sheet
1st - Ivan Lintin. Kawasaki/Devitt RC Express Racing. Time 01:16:26:681 Speed 118.454
2nd - James Hillier. Kawasaki/Quattro Plant Muc-Off Kawasaki. Time 01:16:39:153 Speed 118.133
3rd - Martin Jessopp. Kawasaki/Riders Motorcycles. Time 01:18:23:536 Speed 115.511
4th - Gary Johnson. CFMOTO/WK Bikes. Time 01:18:25:920 Speed 115.453
5th - Stefano Bonetti. Paton/CCM Motorsport. Time 01:18:30:782 Speed 115.334

References

2016
2016 in British motorsport
2016 in motorcycle sport
Isle of Man TT